"Heaven on My Mind" is a song by British singer-songwriter Becky Hill and record producer Sigala. It was released on 25 June 2020 as the second single from her debut studio album, Only Honest on the Weekend. The music video for the song, directed by Rebekah Bird, accompanied the song's release and was premiered on the release date.

Background
In a live conversation with Becky Hill, prior to the song's release in June 2020, Sigala opened up about the song's creative process. He said, "I took some people away with me on a songwriting camp in Thailand. I think it was 3 years ago. I wrote it with Ida Botten, Jason Pebworth and Jarly. I loved when we first wrote it and then nothing ended up happening with it." Becky stated if it was going to be for his debut album Brighter Days, to which he responded, "Yeah. I kept working on production and trying different ideas and the next thing I know, Becky Hill's into it! Then you took it and worked on some bits for it as well."

Becky revealed that her, MNEK and Ryan Ashley worked on the song further before it was released. "The drop changed as well. That took a while to get through.", she elaborated. She also dove into what the song was about to her, "Last year was such a horrible year for me. It was weird because my job was going really well. We just put out stuff well that got into the charts and was doing well. Then you flew me out to Jordan and did this incredible video shoot. So work life was going really well, but my personal life was kind of falling to bits. My grandad died and I fell out with friends, went through a break up and moved house and it all happened at once. And then, you put that song in front of me and I liked it because it was never going to be a song I would've written at the time. I was so miserable last year that this song came through and I was like "Oh wait, I can be happy and there is a light at the end of the tunnel" and I really liked that idea of it. When it came to me, me Uzo and Ryan did our work on it and then it all happened."

On 18 June 2020, a week before the song's release, there were sightings of the song exclusively on Tidal, as well as a tweet to announce the song, before both got quickly taken down.

Music video
The music video for "Heaven on My Mind" was uploaded and premiered onto Becky's YouTube account on 25 June 2020. It was directed by Rebekah Bird.

Charts

Certifications

References

2020 singles
2020 songs
Becky Hill songs
Polydor Records singles
Sigala songs
Songs written by Becky Hill
Songs written by George Astasio
Songs written by Jason Pebworth
Songs written by Jon Shave
Songs written by MNEK
Songs written by Nick Jarl
Songs written by Sigala